Sajni or Sajani may refer to:

 Sajni (film), a 2007 Kannada film
 Sajni (album), a Music album by Shaban Yusuf launched by Venus
 Sajani (1940 film), a Hindi social film
 Sajani (2004 film), a Bengali film